() is the highest lieutenant officer rank in the German-speaking armed forces of Germany (Bundeswehr), the Austrian Armed Forces, and the Swiss Armed Forces.

Austria

Germany

In the German Army, it dates from the early 19th century. Translated as "senior lieutenant", the rank is typically bestowed upon commissioned officers after five to six years of active-duty service.

 is used by both the German Army and the German Air Force. In the NATO military comparison system, a German  is the equivalent of a First lieutenant in the Army/Air Forces of Allied nations.

Other uses

The equivalent naval rank is Oberleutnant zur See.

National People's Army 

In the GDR National People's Army (NPA) the rank was the highest lieutenant rank, until 1990. This was in reference to Soviet military doctrine and in line with other armed forces of the Warsaw pact.

The equivalent rank in the Volksmarine (en: GDR Navy) was Oberleutnant zur See. Later it was shortened to simply ; however, internally  continued to be used. With reference to the Soviet armed forces and to other armed forces of the Warsaw pact  was the second lowest officer rank until 1990.

Switzerland

See also
 Comparative army officer ranks of Europe
 Rank insignia of the German Bundeswehr
 Yliluutnantti

References

Bibliography 

 
 

Military ranks of Germany
Military officer ranks